The 1973 Luhuo earthquake struck near the town of Zhaggo in Garzê Tibetan Autonomous Prefecture of Sichuan Province, China on February 6, 1973, with a magnitude of 7.6 . The earthquake had a maximum intensity of X (Extreme) on the Modified Mercalli intensity scale. It resulted in between 2,175 and 2,204 deaths and a further 2,743 injuries. Serious and widespread destruction occurred in Luhuo County.

Tectonic setting

Western Sichuan is situated at the edge of the Tibetan Plateau in a vast zone of complex continental deformation caused by the collision of the Indian Plate with the Eurasian Plate. As thrusting of the Indian Plate beneath the Eurasian Plate along the Himalayas continues, the continental crust within the Eurasian Plate is actively uplifted and thickened, forming the Tibetan Plateau. As there are no active thrust structures within the plateau, compression is accommodated by strike-slip motion along large structures including the Altyn Tagh Fault, Kunlun Fault, Haiyuan Fault and Xianshuihe fault system. Left-lateral strike-slip motion squeezes the crustal blocks of the Tibetan Plateau outwards, forcing it to move eastwards. Meanwhile, the strike-slip motion also results in east-west extension of the plateau, causing normal faults to break within the thickened crust.

Earthquake

The fault is one of the largest active intracontinental geological structure in the world. Since 1893, at least  of the fault length has ruptured in large successive earthquakes with magnitudes 6.5 or larger. From 1700 to the present-day, the fault has ruptured its entire length during large earthquakes.

Initially, the earthquake measured 7.9 on the Chinese surface-wave magnitude scale; further analysis and recalculation of the event brought the final revision to 7.6. This event was the result of pure left-lateral slip on the Luhou segment of the Xianshuihe fault system. Surface ruptures were well documented by scientists throughout the 90 km length extending from Renda to Kasu. The southeastern  segment of the earthquake rupture overlapped that of the 1923 Renda earthquake, another  7.3 earthquake on the Xianshuihe Fault.

The Luhuo segment of the Xianshuihe fault system was also the source of a magnitude 7.5 earthquake in 1816. Field research through trenching at the Luhuo segment however, revealed a record of earthquake history on the fault in the past 3,000 years. The first event identified in the exposed strata layers corresponded to the year 769 BC. Five additional events were also identified to have occurred in the years 318–545 AD, 677–833 AD, and 1008–1444 AD. A recurrence interval has been calculated at between 157–1,200 years for the earthquakes from 769 BC–1973 AD.

A large aftershock of  6.3 followed a day later, likely triggered by coulomb stress transfer due to the mainshock. Geomorphic evidence of the earthquake was well-preserved because the quake occurred in mid-winter.

Impact
The earthquake killed between 2,175 and 2,204 people in Sichuan Province. It also left 43 orphans in the aftermath.

The earthquake caused extensive destruction along its  of rupture. Almost all homes near or in the path of the rupture were destroyed, amounting to at least 15,700. An estimated 2,867 buildings were also heavily damaged. Across two towns in Luhuo County, 4,600 of the 5,000 homes collapsed while another 880 suffered serious damage. A further 90 sustained cracks. China National Highway 318 or the Sichuan-Tibet highway was damaged by rockfalls, landslides and ground cracks at 17 locations. Other roadways, bridges and telecommunication systems were damaged or disrupted as well. Some 40,427 livestock died and 2.01 million kilograms of food were lost. 

The earthquake triggered 40–50 landslides in the Xianshui River valley. Field surveys observed 137 landslides, all of which lay within the zone of VIII or higher intensity.

Response
A division of the People's Liberation Army was sent to the affected area to assist in rescue and recovery efforts. In the division, at least 668 medical crew from 49 groups attended to injured survivors.

See also
List of earthquakes in 1973
List of earthquakes in China
List of earthquakes in Sichuan

References

External links 
 
 【记忆中的年】四十八年前的春节 – Images of the earthquake

Earthquakes in Sichuan
Earthquakes in China
1973 earthquakes
1973 in China
Garzê Tibetan Autonomous Prefecture
History of Sichuan
February 1973 events in Asia
1973 disasters in China